The United States Air Force's 10th Intelligence Support Squadron is an intelligence unit located at Langley Air Force Base, Virginia.

The squadron was first activated during World War II as the 678th Bombardment Squadron, a United States Army Air Forces combat organization. It was part of the first Boeing B-29 Superfortress group formed for the 58th Bombardment Wing, and served in the China Burma India Theater and Pacific Ocean Theater as part of Twentieth Air Force. The squadron's aircraft engaged in very heavy bombardment operations against Japan. The squadron received the Distinguished Unit Citation for its combat operations on three occasions.  When the unit was returned to the United States in 1945 it was redesignated as the 10th Reconnaissance Squadron, but it was inactivated in March 1946.

Mission

The 10th Intelligence Squadron, teaming with the 30th Intelligence Squadron of Air Combat Command (ACC), operates the multisource intelligence collection and dissemination Contingency Airborne Reconnaissance System Deployable Ground Station One.  Whether deployed or in garrison, the ground station is used to conduct information operations and harmonizes with other theater command, control, communications, computer and intelligence (C4I) systems. It provides information from multiple sensors and correlates them in near real-time to combat command elements in peace, crisis and war.

The squadron is operationally subordinate to Ninth Air Force through Central Air Force Intelligence at Shaw Air Force Base, South Carolina, and administratively subordinate to the 548th Intelligence, Surveillance and Reconnaissance Group. The squadron has two subordinate operating locations:

 Operating Location-CP in Chesapeake, Virginia, provides support to the multiservice Project Crosshair.
 Operating Location-FK in Norfolk, Virginia, provides cryptologic support to the United States Atlantic Command.

The squadron also provides administrative support to Air Combat Command's cryptologic support group. Last, the unit operates the Senior Year ground maintenance training center providing sole source training for Senior Year units worldwide.

The squadron commander provides intelligence to the Air Combat Command Air Operations Center and other national agencies. The squadron integrates into theater C4I, collects, analyzes and correlates raw intelligence products, and provides indications and warning, target and order of battle analysis, battle damage assessment, mission planning support, targeting support, reconnaissance support and exercise support for combat command elements. It also provides overall logistical and communications support to Deployable Ground Station One, which is ready for deployment within 72 hours of notification to disseminate near real-time intelligence to tactical combatants, theater battle managers and National Command Authority.

History

World War II
The squadron was first activated as the 678th Bombardment Squadron on 1 March 1943 at Davis-Monthan Field, Arizona as one of the original squadrons of the 444th Bombardment Group. The 444th was assigned to the first B-29 Superfortress wing, the 58th Bombardment Wing.   After a period of organization at Davis-Monthan the squadron moved to Great Bend Army Air Field, Kansas. for training, initially flying Boeing B-17 Flying Fortresses, Consolidated B-24 Liberators and Martin B-26 Marauders. The group engaged in training on the new aircraft and its mission of long range precision bombing.   At Great Bend, the squadron received early model B-29s and prototype YB-29s, however aircraft were still undergoing development and were frequently modified by Boeing technicians in the field while the squadron was undergoing training in Kansas.  In November 1943 The 444th reorganized as a "Very Heavy" group and added the 7th Bombardment Maintenance Squadrons, which was paired with the 678th to maintain its B-29s.

Operations from India

In early April 1944, the squadron left the United States and deployed to a former B-24 Liberator airfield at Charra Airfield, India. The first airplane of the 444th group landed at Charra on 11 April 1944.  Due to the lack of revetments at Charra the squadron's airplanes were parked wingtip to wingtip on the field's shorter runway.  Charra served only as a maintenance and staging base.  Its runways were too short for a B-29 to take off fully loaded.  While the squadron was stationed there, all missions were flown from the bases of the other bombardment groups of the 58th Bombardment Wing.

From India, the 678th planned to fly missions against Japan from advanced airfields in China. However, all the supplies of fuel, bombs and spare parts needed to support operations from the forward bases in China had to be flown from India over The Hump.  For this role, one aircraft from the squadron was stripped of combat equipment and used as a flying tanker. Each aircraft carried seven tons of fuel, but the amount that was delivered to China depended on weather, including headwinds and aircraft icing which increased the fuel consumption of the "tankers."

The squadron flew its first combat mission on 5 June 1944 against the Makasan railroad yards at Bangkok, Thailand. Ten days later the 678th participated in the first American air attack on the Japanese home islands since the 1942 Doolittle raid, staging through Chinese bases on a nighttime raid against the iron and steel works at Yawata, Japan. It returned to Yawata on 20 August on a daytime raid for which the unit was awarded the Distinguished Unit Citation. Operating from bases in India and at times staging through fields in China, the group struck transportation centers, naval installations, aircraft plants and other targets in Burma, China, Thailand, Japan and Formosa.

On 12 October 1944 the group reorganized.  The 679th Bombardment Squadron and the four bombardment maintenance squadrons were disbanded and their personnel and equipment were transferred to 677th and the other squadrons of the group. As the new year started, Japanese advances forced withdrawal from the Chinese forward operating bases.  Unable to continue attacks on Japan, the unit continued attacking targets in Southeast Asia.

Operations from the Marianas
In the spring of 1945 the 444th and the other groups of the 58th wing moved to Tinian in the Marianas in order to continue operations against Japan. The group and squadron participated in the bombing of strategic objectives, strategic mining of the Inland Sea and in incendiary attacks on urban areas for the duration of the war.  The 678th received a second Distinguished Unit Citation for attacking oil storage facilities at Oshima, bombing an aircraft plant near Kobe, and dropping incendiaries on Nagoya in May 1945. The squadron struck light metal industries at Osaka in July 1945, receiving a third Distinguished Unit Citation for this action. The squadrons's final mission was flown against Hikari, Japan on 14 August 1945, the day before the Japanese surrender.

10th Reconnaissance Squadron
The 678th returned to the United States and Merced Army Air Field, California in November 1945 where it became part of Fourth Air Force of Continental Air Forces (CAF).   Shortly after arriving at Merced, the squadron converted to the reconnaissance mission and became the 10th Reconnaissance Squadron, Very Long Range (Photographic). March 1946 saw more changes as the 10th squadron was reassigned to the 311th Reconnaissance Wing, which inactivated it at the end of the month.

The squadron was activated again in the Air Force Reserve as the 10th Reconnaissance Squadron (Photographic) in 1947 at Rochester Airport, New York as a reconnaissance squadron.  The squadron moved to Langley Air Force Base, Virginia in June 1949 when Continental Air Command reorganized its reserve units according to the wing base organization system.  At Langley it was colocated with the active duty 363d Tactical Reconnaissance Group. It was assigned advanced trainers and trained for supporting Army ground units providing aerial photography with these second-line aircraft for battlefield intelligence.  It received a few jet RF-86A Sabres in late 1949, however inactivated due to budget constraints in January 1950.

The squadron was reactivated as the 10th Strategic Reconnaissance Squadron, part of active duty 26th Strategic Reconnaissance Wing in 1952. Due to Korean War the squadron had minimum personnel strength until mid-1953.  The squadron gathered intelligence on a global scale using RB-47E Stratojets, participating in a variety of SAC directed exercises and operations between 1953 and 1958. These included numerous simulated combat missions and deployments, ranging from a few days to a few months.  The squadron became non-operational in January 1958 as phased down for inactivation due to budget constraints, inactivating in July.

The squadron reactivated as Tactical Air Command RF-4C Phantom II reconnaissance squadron in 1966, conducted replacement training for combat crew members being deployed to Southeast Asia during the Vietnam War.  Inactivated in 1971 as part of the drawdown of forces assigned to Indochina.

Intelligence activities
The 600th Electronic Security Squadron was activated in August 1992 to provide intelligence support to Air Combat Command at Langley Air Force Base, Virginia.  In 1993 the United States Air Force consolidated the 600th with the 10th and designated the consolidated unit the 10th Intelligence Squadron.  The consolidated squadron was redesignated the 10th Intelligence Support Squadron in July 2022.

Lineage
 10th Tactical Reconnaissance Squadron
 Constituted as the 678th Bombardment Squadron (Heavy) on 15 February 1943
 Activated on 1 March 1943
 Redesignated 678th Bombardment Squadron (Heavy) (B-29) on 26 April 1943
 Redesignated 678th Bombardment Squadron, Very Heavy on 20 November 1943
 Redesignated 10th Reconnaissance Squadron, Very Long Range (Photographic) on 17 December 1945.
 Inactivated on 31 March 1946
 Redesignated 10th Reconnaissance Squadron (Photographic) on 8 October 1947
 Activated in the reserve 6 November 1947
 Redesignated 10th Tactical Reconnaissance Squadron (Photographic) on 27 June 1949
 Inactivated on 28 January 1950
 Redesignated 10th Strategic Reconnaissance Squadron, Medium on 9 May 1952
 Activated on 28 May 1952
 Inactivated on 1 July 1958
 Redesignated 10th Tactical Reconnaissance Squadron, Photo-Jet and activated on 3 November 1965 (not organized)
 Organized on 1 January 1966
 Redesignated 10th Tactical Reconnaissance Squadron on 1 October 1966
 Inactivated on 30 June 1971
 Consolidated with the 600th Electronic Security Squadron on 1 October 1993

 10th Intelligence Squadron
 Constituted as the 600th Electronic Security Squadron on 1 August 1992
 Activated on 27 August 1992
 Consolidated with the 10th Tactical Reconnaissance Squadron and redesignated 10th Intelligence Squadron on 1 October 1993

Assignments
 444th Bombardment Group, 1 March 1943
 311th Reconnaissance Wing, 7 March 1946 – 31 March 1946
 26th Reconnaissance Group, 6 November 1947
 Ninth Air Force, 27 June 1949 – 28 January 1950
 26th Strategic Reconnaissance Wing, 28 May 1952 – 1 July 1958
 Tactical Air Command, 3 November 1965 (not organized)
 67th Tactical Reconnaissance Wing, 1 January 1966 – 30 June 1971
 693d Intelligence Wing, 27 August 1992
 67th Intelligence Group, 1 October 1993
 480th Intelligence Group, 31 January 200055
 497th Intelligence Group (later 497th Intelligence, Surveillance and Reconnaissance Group), 1 December 2003 – present

Stations

 Davis-Monthan Field, Arizona, 1 March 1943
 Great Bend Army Air Field, Kansas, 3 August 1943 – 12 March 1944
 Charra Airfield, India, c. 13 April 1944
 Dudhkundi Airfield, India, 1 July 1945 – April 1945
 West Field, Tinian, Northern Mariana Islands, April–27 October 1945
 Merced Army Air Field (later Castle Field), California, 15 November 1945 – 31 March 1946

 Rochester Airport, New York, 6 November 1947
 Langley Air Force Base, Virginia, 27 June 1949 – 28 January 1950
 Lockbourne Air Force Base, Ohio, 28 May 1952 – 1 July 1958
 Mountain Home Air Force Base, Idaho, 1 January 1966 – 30 June 1971
 Langley Air Force Base, Virginia, 27 August 1992 – present

Aircraft

 B-24 Liberator, 1943
 B-17 Flying Fortress, 1943–1944
 YB-29 Superfortress, 1943–1944
 B-29/F-13A Superfortress, 1943–1946
 AT-6 Texan, 1948–1949

 AT-11 Kansan, 1948
 RF-86A Sabre, 1949
 YRB-47 Stratojet, 1954
 RB-47 Stratojet, 1954–1958
 RF-4C Phantom II, 1966–1971

Awards and Campaigns

References

Notes
 Explanatory notes

 Citations

Bibliography

External links
Air Force Historical Research Agency: 8th Intelligence Squadron

Military units and formations in Virginia
0010